María López García (born 16 February 1990) is a  field hockey defender and part of the Spain women's national field hockey team. 

She was part of the Spanish team at the 2016 Summer Olympics in Rio de Janeiro, where they finished eighth. On club level she plays for Club de Campo in Spain

References

External links
 
http://www.gettyimages.com/photos/maria-lopez?excludenudity=true&sort=mostpopular&mediatype=photography&phrase=maria%20lopez&family=editorial
https://www.youtube.com/watch?v=okZObnDBc2I

1990 births
Living people
Olympic field hockey players of Spain
Field hockey players at the 2016 Summer Olympics
Field hockey players at the 2020 Summer Olympics
Spanish female field hockey players
Place of birth missing (living people)